Full Circle – The Photographs is a large coffee-table style book containing pictures taken by Basil Pao, who was the stills photographer on the team that made the Full Circle with Michael Palin TV program for the BBC.

Michael Palin's name is prominently displayed on the cover, and he has contributed a two-page Introduction.

The rest of the book consists of Basil Pao's photographs, each with a short text indicating what the picture is about and where it was taken. Some of the pictures are displayed as impressive two-page spreads.

Unlike the other three photography books made by Basil Pao in connection with the Michael Palin trips, this one does not present the pictures in chronological order. Instead, there is a 40-page section simply called "Land", and a 130-page section simply called "People". Within each section it appears that Basil Pao choose pictures with similar or contrasting subjects to place together.

External links 
The pictures can be viewed for free on Michael Palin's web site

Photographic collections and books
British travel books
1997 non-fiction books
BBC Books books
English non-fiction books